Nodding wakerobin is a common name for several plants and may refer to:

Trillium cernuum
Trillium flexipes, native to North America